Hugh Planche  (born October 3, 1931) is a former provincial level politician from Alberta, Canada. He served as a Member of the Legislative Assembly of Alberta from 1975 to 1986. During his time in office he served as a member of the Executive Council of Alberta as Minister of Economic Development in the Peter Lougheed government from 1979 to 1986.

Political career
Planche ran for a seat to the Alberta Legislature for the first time in the 1975 Alberta general election. He won a landslide majority and defeated Liberal leader Nicholas Taylor to hold the electoral district of Calgary-Glenmore for the Progressive Conservatives.

Planche would run for a second term in the 1979 Alberta general election. His popular vote would take a significant hit as he lost just over 10% from the 1975 election. Nick Taylor would also make big gains in his second run against Planche. Planche still held his seat with a solid majority of the vote. After the election on October 1, 1979, Premier Peter Lougheed appointed Planche Minister of Economic Development.

Planche ran for his third and final term in the 1982 Alberta general election. With his ministerial advantage he rolled up a massive majority taking nearly 80% of the popular vote.  Planche retired at dissolution of the legislature in 1986.

References

External links
Legislative Assembly of Alberta Members Listing

1931 births
Living people
Members of the Executive Council of Alberta
Politicians from Calgary
Progressive Conservative Association of Alberta MLAs